Mandaue City Science High School (MCSHS) is a secondary school founded in 1996 in Opao, Mandaue City, Philippines. It transferred to Ibabao-Estancia, Mandaue City in 2008.

History
Mandaue City Science High School, originally named Mandaue City National Science and Technology High School, started its operation during S.Y. 1996 - 1997 in response to the directive of the DECS Secretary Ricardo T. Gloria It was created to give Mandauehanons access to the best education that caters the need of students who excel in Science and Mathematics.

It is a secondary school which has a special curriculum that provides a more intensive and advanced program, especially in Science and Mathematics. It is a school for more promising students with the objective of fostering the problem-solving approach of critical thinking.

The first intake of MCSHS was composed of 25 students who had superior abilities in science and mathematics. They graduated from different public elementary schools in the city and were rigidly screened and interviewed by the DECS, Mandaue City ESI in Science, Mr. Rigel Devena, who himself campaigned and disseminated the information on the opening of a science high school in the division.

The first batch of students was mostly honor pupils from their respective schools. In fact there were several valedictorians and salutatorians in the group while the rest were honorable mentions.

A full force of Comprehensive teachers took good care of the Science High Students and painstakingly taught them even if it meant an overload since there were no teachers available, then. The advisers of Science High Students were: Mrs. Editha Cinco, Mrs. Dalisay Lumapas, Mrs. Beatriz Vicente, and Mrs. Teresita Garbo. These teachers motivate the future scientists to engage in activities and contests which were either academic, sports-related, or cultural in nature. They excelled in these undertakings and started making a name for the school.

Mrs. Lucilin Suan, former principal of MCCNHS, succeeded Mr. Rigel Devena in the division and in the case of the Science High School. She did the selection and interview of the second batch composed of 20 students and the third batch composed of 20 students.

In 1998, former Mandaue City Schools Supt. Dr. Gloria Pinili pointed out the need to make MCSHS independent and gain recognition from the Bureau of Secondary Education. At the beginning of this plan to separate MCSHS, Dr. Pinili chose a very dynamic administrator whom she saw would ably hold the reins of the division's show-windows on quality education. Mr. Marcelo Inot was picked from the many administrators on the bases of his educational and intellectual qualifications, and his leadership potential.

By S.Y. 1999–2000, Mandaue City Science High School weaned itself from its first foster school and started operating independently. Occupying one of the buildings of DGLLOMNHS, it is now composed of 5 classes with 70 students in the first year, 24 in the second year, 20 in the third year, and 22 in the graduating class, a total of 136 students. They are mentored by 10 young and strong teachers picked equally from strong high schools in Mandaue City.

Since then the school has carved a name for itself as it gained honor and recognition through the students' very good performance in contests and other activities. With the support of the division staff, especially Mrs. Lucilin Suan and Mrs. Milagros Ouano as well as the officials of the barangay headed by Barangay Chairman, Joy Mangubat and the government of Mandaue City headed by Mayor Thadeo Ouano, MCSHS is bound to reap more.

Class Sections

Curriculum 
MCSHS has a curriculum that provides an intensive and advanced program with special reference to Science, English and Mathematics.

Admission
Entrance examinations are given to elementary school pupils with a general average of at least 85% in Math, Science, and English and 80% in other subjects.

The examinees with the best scores in the entrance examination in Mathematics, English and Science (written and practical) are selected until the enrollment limit has been reached.

Retention
To be retained in the MCSHS, students should maintain an overall weighted average of at least 85% provided that no rating in any grading period in Math, English and Science of below 85% and below 80% in other related subjects.

References

External links
Mandaue City Science High School on Facebook

Science high schools in the Philippines
Schools in Mandaue
High schools in Cebu
Public schools in the Philippines